The 1964 Italian local elections were held on 22 and 23 November. The elections were held in 6,767 municipalities and 74 provinces.

Municipal elections
Results summary of the 78 provincial capital municipalities.

Provincial elections

References

External links

1964 elections in Italy
 
Municipal elections in Italy